The Eastern Football Conference may refer to:

 Eastern Football Conference (1965–1974), an NCAA College Division conference
 Eastern Football Conference (1997–2000), an NCAA Division II conference
 East Division (CFL), known as the "Eastern Football Conference" between 1960 and 1980

It could also refer to the Eastern Collegiate Football Conference, the name of two separate NCAA conferences:
 Eastern Collegiate Football Conference (1988–1997), an NCAA Division II conference
 Eastern Collegiate Football Conference, an active NCAA Division III conference established in 2009

American football competitions